Malcolm Jones may refer to:

Malcolm Jones (automobile), an American automobile manufactured in Detroit from 1914 to 1915
Malcolm Jones III (1959–1996), American comic book artist
Malcolm Jones (musician), musician with Runrig
Malcolm Jones (politician) (born 1946), former Australian politician
Malcolm Jones (American football) (born 1992), American football running back
Malcolm Jones (soccer) (born 1997), American soccer player

Jones, Malcolm